The 1893 Liège–Bastogne–Liège was the second edition of the Liège–Bastogne–Liège cycle race and was held on 28 May 1893. The race started and finished in Liège. The race was won by Léon Houa.

General classification

References

1893
1893 in Belgian sport